Taha Yassine Khenissi  (born 6 January 1992) is a Tunisian professional footballer who plays as a forward.

International career
As of 20 December 2020, Khenissi has 41 caps with his country, and has scored 8 goals.

Career statistics

International

Scores and results list Tunisia's goal tally first, score column indicates score after each Template Khenissi.

References

External links
 

1992 births
Living people
People from Zarzis
Association football forwards
Tunisia international footballers
Tunisian footballers
Tunisian Ligue Professionnelle 1 players
Espérance Sportive de Tunis players
CS Sfaxien players
2017 Africa Cup of Nations players
2019 Africa Cup of Nations players
Tunisia youth international footballers
2022 FIFA World Cup players